The men's individual pursuit competition at the 2018 Asian Games was held on 29 August at the Jakarta International Velodrome.

Schedule
All times are Western Indonesia Time (UTC+07:00)

Records

Results

Qualifying

Finals

Bronze

Gold

References

Track Men individual pursuit